Bayandelger (Rich expanse) is a sum (district) of Sükhbaatar Province in eastern Mongolia. The population (as of 2009) of the sum is 4,569 including 1,169 in the sum center.

Climate

Bayandelger has a cold semi-arid climate (Köppen climate classification BSk) with warm summers and very cold winters. Most precipitation falls in the summer as rain. Winters are very dry.

References

Districts of Sükhbaatar Province